Mianwali Bangla , (Punjabi: میانوالی بنٚگلا), is a small village and during recent years expanded into town located on Gujranwala Pasrur Road in Sialkot District, Pakistan.
The BRBD Canal divides the town into two parts: the old town is on the right bank and on other side is the new area called Bangla or Bazaar.

The New Town population is shifted from adjoining villages like weerwala Changi Sakhana Bajwa Dheerki Siyan etc.
Nowadays Mianwali Bangla is almost merged with Siranwali and Satrah.

History 
The town was a site of Irrigation Rest House and staff colony settled by the British Raj government.  Now, the rest house and Colony are almost ruined. and Now Rest House and staff colony called Bajwa Colony as well.

Advancement 
 A Bazaar with a few medical stores, grocery and clothing shops, Agriculture tools Industry, Rice Mills Engineering, The Chenab School, Taxi & Bus stand are all facilitating people of town and nearby villages. The town is growing rapidly from some years.

Sialkot